There have been at least three places called Nineveh in England.

Two are hamlets in the northern part of the county of Worcestershire.

Villages in England